Barbara Perić (born 17 August 1987) is a Croatian footballer who plays as a midfielder. She has been a member of the Croatia women's national team.

References

1987 births
Living people
Women's association football midfielders
Croatian women's footballers
Croatia women's international footballers